
The Arkansas Scenic Byways Program is a list of highways, mainly state highways, that have been designated by the Arkansas Department of Transportation (ArDOT) as scenic highways. The Arkansas General Assembly designates routes for scenic byway status upon successful nomination. For a highway to be declared scenic, a group interested in preserving the scenic, cultural, recreational, and historic qualities of the route must be created. Mayors of all communities along the route and county judges from each affected county must be included in the organization. Scenic highways are marked with a circular shield in addition to regular route markers.

There are currently 11 scenic routes that have been designated Arkansas state scenic byways.  Three of these byways are also National Scenic Byways.

National scenic byways

State byways
 Scenic Highway 7
 Boston Mountains Scenic Loop
 Interstate 530 Scenic Byway
 Mount Magazine Scenic Byway
 Ozark Highlands Scenic Byway
 Pig Trail Scenic Byway
 Sylamore Scenic Byway
 West–Northwest Scenic Byway

Gallery

See also

References

External links
 Arkansas Parks and Recreation: Scenic Byways 

 
Scenic Byways
Roads in Arkansas
Tourist attractions in Arkansas